The 1910–11 Illinois Fighting Illini men's basketball team represented the University of Illinois.

Regular season
The 1910–11 season witnessed only the second coach to remain for more than one season since the beginning of the program. Thomas E. Thompson led the Fighting Illini's basketball program for both the 1910–11 season and 1911–12 season compiling an overall record of 14 wins and 14 losses.  Thompson claimed, at the time, to be the only player in Western Conference history to have played five years of collegiate basketball. He was at Northwestern for one year before playing at Illinois for four additional seasons. After leaving the coaching ranks, he founded The Thomas C. Thompson Company in Highland Park, IL, a manufacturer of enamel products.

The Illini finished the 1910–11 season with an overall record of six wins and six losses with a conference record of six wins, five losses and a fourth-place finish in the conference.

Roster

Source

Schedule
												
Source																

|-	
!colspan=12 style="background:#DF4E38; color:white;"| Non-Conference regular season
|- align="center" bgcolor=""

|-	
!colspan=9 style="background:#DF4E38; color:#FFFFFF;"|Big Ten regular season	

			

					

												

Bold Italic connotes conference game

Awards and honors

References

Illinois Fighting Illini
Illinois Fighting Illini men's basketball seasons
1910 in sports in Illinois
1911 in sports in Illinois